The action of 8 June 1945, sometimes called the Sinking of Ashigara was a naval action that resulted in the sinking of the heavy cruiser  of the Imperial Japanese Navy by the British Royal Navy submarine . Ashigara was transporting Japanese troops from Dutch East Indies for the defence of Singapore, and the sinking resulted in a heavy loss of life.

Background
Ashigara departed Batavia (present-day Jakarta) on 7 June 1945 for Singapore with 1,600 troops and 480 tons of supplies on board to reinforce the defence of that city. She was escorted by the destroyer , which had survived the Japanese defeat in the Malacca Strait.  Their planned route was north from Batavia, then NNW through the Bangka Strait between Sumatra and Bangka Island, then north to Singapore.

The U.S. Navy submarine USS Blueback observed their departure but was unable to maneuver into an attack position.  Blueback'''s contact report was passed on to HMS Trenchant, under the command of Cdr Arthur Hezlet.  In company with the submarine  (Lt G. C. Clarabut), Trenchant took up position on the northern approaches of Bangka Strait - Trenchant just inside the strait, south of Hendrik Klippen Shoal, while Stygian patrolled north of the shoal.  Both submarines were on the surface.  To get into position, Trenchant had to negotiate a minefield laid earlier by the Royal Netherlands Navy submarine HNLMS O 19.

The action
On 8 June 1945 at 0423, Kamikaze was spotted by Trenchant, which in turn was spotted by the Japanese destroyer at 0436. Kamikaze began firing her guns at Trenchant, and the submarine fired a single torpedo from her stern tubes; however, both ships missed each other and also lost contact. Trenchant immediately sent a contact report to Stygian, reporting that she had been detected by the destroyer, then changed position to east of the shoal and dived at 0702. Hezlet spotted Kamikaze again at 0955 heading north, but disappearing from sight at 1030.Stygian saw star shells fired by Kamikaze at 0439 during the short engagement with Trenchant, and also received the contact report. She remained north of the shoal, judging correctly that Trenchant was clear of the enemy, since there was no further gunfire, and no depth charge detonations had been heard, then dived at 0722. At 1015 she spotted Kamikaze heading north, along with patrolling Japanese aircraft. Kamikaze counterattacked the submarine with depth charges, causing minor damage to Stygian, but then lost contact, with depth-charge explosions becoming more and more distant.    
 
Trenchant did not close the range, assuming that Ashigara would come closer to her by taking the more open water east of the shoal (closer to Bangka Island), but instead the heavy cruiser chose to pass through the very restricted water west of the shoal, closer to the Sumatra coast.

At such a distance, Hezlet had to quickly make precise calculations before his chance of an attack disappeared. At 1209 Trenchant fired a full bow salvo of eight torpedoes from abaft the cruiser's starboard beam at a range of  aimed individually from a quarter of length ahead to a quarter of a length astern. However, this was not enough to evade the attack, and after three minutes five torpedoes struck Ashigara on the starboard side, causing severe damage and setting her on fire. Trenchants company queued to view through the search periscope, but the periscope attracted fire from Ashigara's anti-aircraft guns. Hezlet then turned Trenchant to bring her stern tubes to bear and fired two more torpedoes at 1224, but missed. Ashigara capsized to starboard at 1239, and Kamikaze picked up survivors, assisted by two local vessels. Trenchant remained submerged and escaped to the north of Bangka Strait, returning to Subic Bay, Philippines on 20 June 1945, followed by Stygian on 27 June 1945.

Aftermath
Losses in the sinking were heavy; out of 1,600 troops, only 400 were saved, while 850 of her crew were rescued, including Captain Miura. Ashigara had been the last remaining major Japanese warship in the area after the cruiser  was sunk the previous month by British destroyers. After her sinking, the 10th Area Fleet based out of Singapore was left with Kamikaze as its only significant surface ship.

The sinking of Ashigara earned Hezlet a bar to his DSO and the U.S. Legion of Merit. HMS Trenchant'' flew the Jolly Roger as a tribute to her success when she reached her base at Trincomalee. Tactically it was one of the most brilliant submarine attacks of the war in terms of range.

See also
 List by death toll of ships sunk by submarines

References

Citations

Bibliography

External links
 British submarines of World War II | HMS Trenchant
 uboat.net | HMS Trenchant (P 331)
 uboat.net | HMS Stygian (P 249)
 combinedfleet.com | IJN ASHIGARA: Tabular Record of Movement
 sci.military.naval › Sinking of Japanese cruiser Ashigara

Conflicts in 1945
Maritime incidents in June 1945
A
Naval battles of World War II involving Japan
Java Sea
Submarine warfare in World War II
June 1945 events in Asia